Kai Laukkanen (born 8 April 1975) is a Finnish former motorcycle speedway rider.

Career
Laukkanen won the final running of the Intercontinental Final in 2001. He rode in 2004 Speedway Grand Prix and won the bronze medal in 2005 Individual Speedway European Championship.

He is an eight times national champion of Finland after winning the Finnish Individual Speedway Championship in 1997, 1999, 2000, 2001, 2002, 2003, 2004 and 2006.

Major results

World Championships 
 Individual World Championship and Speedway Grand Prix
 2002 - 28th place (6 pts in one event)
 2004 - 20th place (25 pts)
 2007 - 23rd place (5 pts in three events)
 Team World Championship (Speedway World Team Cup and Speedway World Cup)
 1995 - 7th place in Group B
 2000 - 2nd place in Quarter-Final A
 2001 - 9th place
 2002 - 8th place
 2003 - 7th place
 2006 - 7th place
 2007 - 8th place
 2009 - 3rd place in Qualifying round 2
 Individual U-21 World Championship
 1995 -  Tampere - 5th place (12 pts)
 1996 -  Olching - 9th place (7 pts)

European Championships 

 Individual European Championship
 2005 -  Lonigo - 3rd place (12 pts)
 European Pairs Championship
 2006 - Finland Withdrew from Final
 2007 -  Terenzano - 4th place (16 pts)
 2008 - 5th place in Semi-Final 2

See also 
 Finland national speedway team
 List of Speedway Grand Prix riders

References 

1975 births
Finnish speedway riders
Living people
Oxford Cheetahs riders